Cymindis pecirkai is a species of ground beetle in the subfamily Harpalinae. It was described by Jedlicka in 1946.
It is found in Kazakhstan.

References

pecirkai
Beetles described in 1946